Peter Bromhead  (born 31 May 1933) is a New Zealand commercial interior designer, cartoonist and illustrator.

Bromhead was born in Portsmouth, England, on 31 May 1933. He trained as an industrial designer in England and Sweden and migrated to New Zealand in the 1950s, and becoming a naturalised New Zealand citizen in 1979. He was the editorial cartoonist for the Auckland Star from 1973 to 1989.

In the 1999 Queen's Birthday Honours, Bromhead was appointed a Member of the New Zealand Order of Merit, for services as a cartoonist. In 2008 he was made a life member as a Fellow of the Designers Institute of New Zealand. 

Bromhead was described by Richard Long, former editor of The Dominion Post, as probably the best pocket cartoonist operating in the British Commonwealth. He has received 11 awards for cartooning at the Voyager Media Awards (previously Canon Media Awards and Qantas Media Awards).

Family life 
Peter Bromhead has been married four times. Father of 9 known children, with a daughter Esme from the first marriage, Ben, Kate and Hannah are in the mix from different mothers followed by Tim, Kitty, and Thomas from the second and two sons Oscar and Felix with his third wife Carolyn.  There is a 56-year gap between his children and he is believed to be almost certainly New Zealand's oldest father.

References

External links
peterbromhead.com
Search for material relating to Peter Bromhead on DigitalNZ.

1933 births
Living people
New Zealand cartoonists
New Zealand editorial cartoonists
Artists from Portsmouth
English emigrants to New Zealand
Naturalised citizens of New Zealand
Members of the New Zealand Order of Merit
New Zealand interior designers